Morgan Adrar (born March 24,1987) is a Lightweight  French Muay Thai kickboxer of Moroccan descent.

Career 
January 23, 2016 in Arbent, France Burning Series, Morgan Adrar defeated Mehdi Zatout win the 2016 WBC -67kg World Championship belt.

Championships and awards 
Muay Thai
WBC
2016 WBC -67kg World Championship
2013 WBC -69.8kg European Championship

WMC
2014 WMC -67kg European Championship

Kickboxing record

|- style="background:#fbb"
| 2022-03-26 || Loss ||align=left| Jordan Valdinocci || The Arena 4 || Milan, Italy || Decision (Unanimous) || 3 || 3:00
|- style="background:#cfc"
| 2020-01-19 || Win ||align=left| Abdelnour Ali-Kada || All Star Muay-Thai Opéra II || Paris, France || Decision (Unanimous) || 5 || 3:00
|- style="background:#fbb;"
| 2019-12-14 || Loss ||align=left| Dmitry Varats || Golden Fight Tournament Semi Finals || Paris, France || Decision || 3 ||
|- style="background:#fbb;"
| 2019-06-29 || Loss ||align=left| Valentin Thibaut || Arena Boxing || Fréjus, France || Decision || 3 ||
|- style="background:#cfc"
| 2019-05-18 || Win ||align=left| Caner Kart || Phenix Boxing Only 7 || Saint-Julien-en-Genevois, France || Decision (Unanimous) || 5 || 3:00
|- style="background:#cfc"
| 2018-06-23 || Win ||align=left| Samed Memaj || Burning Series 7 || Bellegarde-sur-Valserine, France || KO || 2 || 3:00
|- style="background:#fbb;"
| 2017-06-29 || Loss ||align=left| Littewada Sitthikul || Best Of Siam XI || France || TKO || 2 ||
|-  style="background:#fbb;"
| 2017-05-27 || Loss ||align=left| Azize Hlali || Warriors Night || France || Decision || 3 || 3:00
|-  style="background:#fbb;"
| 2017-04-29|| Loss ||align=left| Pakorn PKSaenchaimuaythaigym || Phoenix Fighting Championship || Lebanon || Decision || 5 || 3:00 
|-
! style=background:white colspan=9 |
|-  style="background:#fbb;"
| 2017-01-28 || Loss ||align=left| Manaowan Sitsongpeenong || Burning Series 6 || Paris, France || Decision || 5 || 3:00
|-
! style=background:white colspan=9 |
|- style="background:#cfc"
| 2016-12-10 || Win ||align=left| Anvar Boynazarov || Phoenix Fighting Championship || Keserwan, Lebanon || Decision (Unanimous) || 5 || 3:00
|- style="background:#cfc"
| 2016-10-29 || Win ||align=left| Keo Rumchong || Best of Siam IX || Paris, France || Decision (Unanimous) || 5 || 3:00
|- style="background:#cfc"
| 2016-06-17 || Win ||align=left| Xing Xqiang || Wu Lin Feng || Zhengzhou, China || Decision (Unanimous) || 5 || 3:00
|-  style="background:#cfc;"
| 2016-01-23 || Win ||align=left| Mehdi Zatout || Burning Series || Arbent, France || Decision || 3 || 3:00
|-
! style=background:white colspan=9 |
|-  style="background:#fbb;"
| 2015-12-11 || Loss ||align=left| Charles François (kickboxer) || Best Of Siam 7 || Paris, France || Decision || 5 || 3:00
|-  style="background:#fbb;"
| 2015-06-19 || Loss ||align=left| Changpuek MuaythaiAcademy || Best Of Siam 6 || Paris, France || Decision || 5 || 3:00
|-  style="background:#fbb;"
| 2015-03-07 || Loss ||align=left| Jimmy Vienot || Ultimate Fight 2 || France || Decision || 5 || 3:00
|- style="background:#fbb;"
| 2014-11-22 || Loss || align=left| Saenchai || THAI FIGHT Khon Kaen || Khon Kaen, Thailand || Decision || 3 || 3:00
|-  style="background:#cfc;"
| 2014-11-01 || Win ||align=left| Pich Seiha || Apsara || Cambodia || Decision || 5 || 3:00
|-  style="background:#cfc;"
| 2014-06-14 || Win ||align=left| Azize Hlali || Best of Siam 5 || France || Decision || 5 || 3:00
|-  style="background:#fbb;"
| 2014-05-24 || Loss ||align=left| Charles François (kickboxer) || Ring's Tiger 3 || Chavelot, France || Decision || 5 || 3:00
|-  style="background:#cfc;"
| 2014-04-05 || Win ||align=left| Alessio Arduini || Gala de Privas || Privas, France || KO || 2 || 
|-
! style=background:white colspan=9 |
|-  style="background:#fbb;"
| 2014-1-25 || Loss ||align=left| Bobo Sacko || La Ligue des Gladiateurs || Paris, France || Decision (Unanimous) || 3 || 3:00
|-  style="background:#fbb;"
| 2013-10-23 || Loss ||align=left| Azize Hlali || THAI FIGHT 2013: 1st Round - 67kg Tournament Quarter-Final || Bangkok, Thailand || Decision || 5 || 3:00
|-  style="background:#cfc;"
| 2013-05-25 || Win ||align=left| Aziz Ali Kada || La Nuit Des Titans || Andrézieux-Bouthéon, France || TKO (Referee Stoppage) || 5 || 
|-
! style=background:white colspan=9 |
|-  style="background:#fbb;"
| 2013-02-23 || Loss ||align=left| Yazid Boussaha || Lion Belt Fight Night 3 || Belfort, France || Decision || 5 || 3:00
|-  style="background:#cfc;"
| 2012-12-22 || Win ||align=left| Murvin Babajee || Boxe Thaïlandaise || Arbent, France || TKO (Doctor Stoppage) || 2 ||
|-  style="background:#fbb;"
| 2012-10-20 || Loss ||align=left| Rit Ubon || Roschtigrabe Derby || Uetendorf, Switzerland || Decision || 5 || 3:00
|-  style="background:#cfc;"
| 2012-09-08 || Win ||align=left| Christophe Pruvost || Grand Casino Baden Fight Night || Baden, Switzerland || KO (Left Uppercut) || 2 ||
|-  style="background:#cfc;"
| 2012-04-28 || Win ||align=left| Millon Bheran || Le Banner Series: acte 1 || Genève, Switzerland || Decision || 5 || 3:00
|-  style="background:#fbb;"
| 2012-03-31 || Loss ||align=left| Ruengsak Suchat || Boxe Thai Privas || Privas, France || Decision || 5 || 3:00
|-  style="background:#cfc;"
| 2012-03-31 || Win ||align=left| Youssef El Hadmi || Boxe Thai Privas || Privas, France || Decision || 5 || 3:00
|-  style="background:#cfc;"
| 2011-12-10 || Win ||align=left| Lopburi || International Fight Show 2011 || Loano, Italy || TKO (Doctor Stoppage) || 3 ||
|-  style="background:#cfc;"
| 2011-11-26 || Win ||align=left| Eugeniu Deozu || Iron Fighter || Zoppola, Italy || KO (Right Cross) || 2 ||
|-  style="background:#fbb;"
| 2011-10-01 || Loss ||align=left| Armin Pumpanmuang || Röschtigraben 2: Derby || Lausanne, Switzerland || TKO (cut) || 2 ||
|-  style="background:#fbb;"
| 2011-06-25 || Loss ||align=left| Nordin Ben Moh || Superpro Fightnight || Bâle, Switzerland || TKO || 2 ||
|-  style="background:#fbb;"
| 2011-05-21 || Loss ||align=left| Sak Kaoponlek || La Notte Dei Campioni || Seregno, Italy || TKO (Doctor Stoppage) || 2 ||
|-  style="background:#cfc;"
| 2011-04-30 || Win ||align=left| Jérémy Antonio || Boxe Thaïlandaise || Arbent, France || KO || 1 ||
|-  style="background:#cfc;"
| 2011-02-26 || Win ||align=left| Ivan Moscatelli || Boxe Thaïlandaise || Moirans, France || KO (Right Hook) || 1 ||
|-  style="background:#cfc;"
| 2010-10-23 || Win ||align=left| Joseph Pinto || Roschtigraben Derby || Uetendorf, Switzerland || Decision || 5 || 3:00
|-  style="background:#cfc;"
| 2010-05-29 || Win ||align=left| Seyed Bensaada || Boxe Thai Tournament IV || Thônex, Switzerland || KO || 3 || 
|-
| colspan=9 | Legend:

References 

1987 births
Living people
French male kickboxers
French Muay Thai practitioners
Lightweight kickboxers
Welterweight kickboxers